Star-Crossed Lovers (King's Children; also known as Invincible Love) is a 1962 East German romantic war drama film directed by Frank Beyer.

Plot
Magdalena and Michael are two children from working-class families in Berlin, who have sworn to marry each other. When they grow older, after the Nazis rose to power, Michael is arrested for being a member of the Communist Party. Magdalena joins the underground party to continue his work. Jürgen, a friend of the two who is now a storm trooper, tries to convince her not to become a communist. During the Second World War, Michael is sent a penal battalion on the Eastern Front, where he meets Jürgen again as a commanding officer. Michael overpowers him, defects to the Red Army and returns to the battalion once more to convince the soldiers to surrender, thus saving their lives. He reaches Moscow, where he sees Magdalena board a plane. He tries to call out for her, but she does not hear him. They will never meet again.

Cast
Annekathrin Bürger as Magdalena
Armin Mueller-Stahl as Michael
Ulrich Thein as Jürgen
Manfred Krug as captain
Marga Legal as Mrs. Seifert
Betty Loewen as Hanna Bartels
Monika Lennartz as Katya
Gertraud Kreissig as Ursula
Natalia Illina as Vera
Talla Novikova as pilot
Leonid Svetlov as Sasha
Nikolai Lukinov as Red Army Major
Walter Lendrich as Schröter
Günter Naumann as Herbert
Fred Delmare as Albert
Erik Veldre as Hans

Production
The work on Star-Crossed Lovers began even before the principal photography of Beyer's previous pictures, Five Cartridges, was completed.  Most of the crew of Five Cartridges, mainly writers Edith and Walter Gorrish, collaborated again to create the new picture, as well as actor Armin Mueller-Stahl. The producers employed the technique of a story board, which was pioneered by Beyer in his last film. He also used several expressionist motifs during the shooting, to recreate the atmosphere of Germany in the 1930s.

Reception
Star-Crossed Lovers won Frank Beyer a special Medal of Honor in the 13th Karlovy Vary International Film Festival.

Daniela Berghahn considered the picture as a "prominent example" to the DEFA films that "transgressed the aesthetic boundaries of Social Realism." Axel Geiss wrote that the film was a representative of "DEFA's most important tradition: the dealing with the Nazi past." Paul Cooke and Marc Silberman commented that the antifascist cause was shown by the picture to be ultimately more important than the romantic ideals.

At 1985, the film was withdrawn from circulation by the DEFA Commission, after Armin Mueller-Stahl and other members of the crew emigrated to West Germany.

References

External links
 
 Star-Crossed Lovers at filmportal.de/en
Star-Crossed Lovers on cinema.de

1962 films
East German films
Films directed by Frank Beyer
1960s German-language films
Films set in Berlin
Eastern Front of World War II films
German war drama films
German romance films
Films set in the 1930s
Films set in the 1940s
1960s war drama films
1960s romance films
1962 drama films
1960s German films